José María Jáuregui Lagunas (15 March 1896 – 3 May 1988) was a Spanish footballer. He competed in the men's tournament at the 1928 Summer Olympics.

References

External links
 

1896 births
1988 deaths
Spanish footballers
Spain international footballers
Olympic footballers of Spain
Footballers at the 1928 Summer Olympics
Association football goalkeepers
Footballers from Getxo
La Liga players
Arenas Club de Getxo footballers